Kenny Dichter is an American entrepreneur and the CEO of privately held aviation company, Wheels Up. He also co-founded Alphabet City Sports Records, Marquis Jet, and Tequila Avión.

Career

Alphabet City Sports Records 
After graduating from the University of Wisconsin in 1990, Dichter founded Alphabet City Sports Records with friend Jesse Itzler/ The label focused on creating and selling songs that were frequently heard in sports stadiums and arenas. The firm was eventually sold to SFX Entertainment in 1998 for $4.3 million in cash and stock.

Marquis Jets 
Dichter founded Marquis Jets in 2001, the first  fractional card jet program. By 2007, the firm was turning over more than $700 million per year from its 3,500 customers. In November 2010, Dichter sold Marquis Jet to NetJets, a subsidiary of Warren Buffett's Berkshire Hathaway.

Tequila Avión
Tequila Avión, a brand of tequila, was founded by Dichter and Ken Austin.  The brand  was named the 'Best Tequila in the World' and 'Best White Spirit in the World' at the 2012 San Francisco World Spirits Competition

Wheels Up 
A few years after the sale of Marquis Jets, Dichter re-entered the private aviation industry by founding Wheels Up. Rather than a fractional card program, Wheels Up is a membership-based business that charges users per flight hour without spending requirements or time commitments.

See also
Wheels Up
Tequila Avión

References

Living people
American chief executives
University of Wisconsin–Madison alumni
Year of birth missing (living people)